Muchas Gracias: The Best of Kyuss is a compilation album by American stoner rock band Kyuss, released in 2000 through Elektra Records. Although promoted as a "best of" album, it features mostly rare tracks and B-sides and includes only five tracks from the band's four studio albums. The final four tracks are live recordings from a May 24, 1994 performance in Hamburg, previously released as the Live at Marquee Club EP which was included with the first 3,000 copies of the band's 1994 album Welcome to Sky Valley released in Germany and Australia; the tracks were also included on various editions of the "Demon Cleaner" single that same year.

Track listing 
Writing credits adapted from the album's liner notes.

Tracks 12–15 recorded May 24, 1994, at the Marquee Club in Hamburg, Germany.

Personnel 
Credits adapted from the album's liner notes.

Band
 John Garcia – vocals, producer
 Josh Homme – guitar, producer
 Scott Reeder – bass guitar on tracks 1, 2, 4–6, and 8–15; producer
 Nick Oliveri – bass guitar on tracks 3 and 7; producer
 Alfredo Hernández – drums on tracks 1, 2, 4, 6, and 8–15; producer
 Brant Bjork – drums on tracks 3, 5, and 7; producer

Production
 Niels Anderson – track compiler
 Batterman – track compiler
 Henning Mielke – compilation supervisor
 Chris Goss – producer of tracks 1, 3, and 5
 Catherine Enny – producer of track 7
 Ron Krown – producer of track 7
 Patrick "Hutch" Hutchinson – recording engineer and producer of tracks 12–15
 Der Diener – cover design
 Arne Ketelsen – cover photography

References 

Kyuss albums
2000 greatest hits albums
Elektra Records compilation albums